In 1981, BBC Radio 4 produced a dramatisation of J. R. R. Tolkien's The Lord of the Rings in 26 half-hour stereo instalments. The novel had previously been adapted as a 12-part BBC Radio adaptation in 1955 and 1956 (of which no recordings are known to have survived), and a 1979 production by The Mind's Eye for National Public Radio in the USA.

Like the novel on which it is based, the radio series tells the story of an epic struggle between the Dark Lord Sauron of Mordor, the primary villain of the work, and an alliance of heroes who join forces to save the world from falling under his shadow.

Development

Early stages and commissioning 

The BBC entered negotiations with The Saul Zaentz Company to obtain the radio rights to adapt The Lord of the Rings in 1979, following the release of the Ralph Bakshi animated film. J. R. R. Tolkien had sold the film, stage and merchandising rights to United Artists in 1969, who had subsequently sold them to The Saul Zaentz Company in 1976. The negotiations were protracted but ironically entirely unnecessary as the radio rights had never passed to the film company and were still controlled by the Tolkien estate. 

Brian Sibley was a young scriptwriter who had written a number of radio features for the BBC, but lacked experience adapting works of literature, having previously only adapted a short fantasy by James Thurber. In 1979, Sibley submitted an idea for an original radio drama to Head of Drama Script Unit, Richard Imison, but was rejected. In his rejection letter, Imison asked Sibley to suggest a list of novels he would like to see adapted. Sibley submitted “about a baker’s dozen” suggestions, and added The Lord of the Rings in a postscript, declaring it “the one book I would really like to adapt for radio.”
Some weeks later in a chance meeting on a corridor in Broadcasting House, Imison asked Sibley how he had learned that the BBC were in negotiations to obtain the rights. Sibley stated that he had not been aware, and had suggested the book because he was "simply in love with [it]", having read it for the first time during an extended hospital stay a few years earlier. The BBC commissioned the adaptation and offered it to Sibley as the lead writer. The commissioners had determined that it should comprise 26 half-hour episodes (6 months' worth of weekly broadcasts), and that scriptwriting should be divided between two writers. Michael Bakewell was brought in as the second writer – a former producer and writer whose previous credits included a radio adaptation of Tolstoy’s War and Peace.

Writing 

Sibley and Bakewell began the process of adapting the books by arranging the core storyline into 26 episode synopses, each with its own conventional narrative structure and ending on a natural ‘cliffhanger’. From these synopses, the full episode scripts would be developed. The source material presented a variety of challenges to the adaptation process. Sibley recalls pacing difficulties due to the book's fluctuations between "sections rich in description, others containing lengthy historical resumés, some having an abundance of dialogue, while others are almost entirely narrative." These challenges led to decisions to omit sections and characters that were deemed not to meaningfully advance the core plot. As such, the serial omits several sequences, most notably those in Book 1 in which the hobbits come to Crickhollow, enter the Old Forest, and encounter the Barrow-wights, Old Man Willow, and ultimately Tom Bombadil. On the latter, Sibley has stated he considers Bombadil to be a character Tolkien created independently of The Lord of the Rings, and that it was preferable to "excise one large episode than to dramatically reduce several others." On the decision to excise some minor characters who appeared for only a few lines of the book, Sibley stated he felt it preferable to remove the character altogether than the alternative, "which would have been to fabricate dialogue for them."
The adaptation radically restructured the chronology of the chapters in Books 3-6, flattening out Tolkien's interlacing by splicing the journey of Frodo and Sam with events in the West. This aligned them with the timeline of events provided by Tolkien in the Appendices, and kept more of the actors employed for more of the episodes.

The script attempts to be as faithful as possible to the original novel with many sections of dialogue lifted directly from the source material, such as the conversations between Frodo, Sam and Faramir in The Window on the West. The script also includes an arc where Wormtongue is waylaid by the Ringwraiths, as narrated in Unfinished Tales, a newly-published volume at that time. In the final episode, Bilbo's Last Song, a Tolkien poem which does not appear in the novel, is used to flesh out the sequence at the Grey Havens. The author's son and editor Christopher Tolkien reviewed and approved the final scripts for each episode. He recorded an audio cassette of correct pronunciations for Middle-earth words and names to assist the cast during recordings.

Recording 

Recording took place at BBC Broadcasting House over two months in 1980. One-and-a-half days was allotted for each of the 26 episodes to be rehearsed and recorded. Sibley recalls the recording sessions having "quite a lot of laughter, quite a few tears, and a number of frazzled tempers". Gandalf-actor Michael Hordern recalled the sessions as "a bit of a slog".

Elizabeth Parker of the BBC Radiophonic Workshop produced the sound effects. The composer Stephen Oliver, who had previously scored the RSC's successful production of Nicholas Nickleby, scored the music, with over 100 cues through the original 26-episode serial. The series was directed by Jane Morgan and Penny Leicester. Morgan stated she was anxious to avoid sound effects that were "too literal", and wished to incorporate music in complex battle scenes.

Episodes 

 *1.4–1.8 on Crickhollow, Fatty Bolger, the Old Forest, Barrow-wights and Tom Bombadil omitted

Broadcasts and release 

The serial was first broadcast from 8 March to 30 August 1981 on BBC Radio 4 on Sundays from 12 noon to 12:30pm; each episode was repeated on the following Wednesday from 10:30pm to 11:00pm. A soundtrack album featuring a re-recorded and in some cases expanded suite of Stephen Oliver's music was released in 1981.

The 26-part series was edited into 13 hour-long episodes broadcast from 17 July to 9 October 1982, restoring some dialogue originally cut for timing.  Following the success of Peter Jackson's The Lord of the Rings film trilogy in the early 2000s, the BBC reissued its radio series in three sets (audiobooks) corresponding to the three original volumes (The Fellowship of the Ring, The Two Towers and The Return of the King). This version omitted the original episode divisions, and included new opening and closing monologues for the first two sets, and an opening monologue only for the last, written by Sibley and performed by Ian Holm as Frodo Baggins. The soundtrack with Stephen Oliver's music, digitally remastered, was included with The Return of the King set, with a demo of John Le Mesurier singing Bilbo's Last Song as a bonus track.

Analysis 

Sibley thought the casting of Ian Holm as Frodo "simply inspired", his performance "of unswerving determination, tempered always with humour and vulnerability." He felt that Hordern managed to "become" Gandalf, "by intuition or some other theatrical magic ... by turn wise, stern and compassionate, a force for good, a constant light in an ever-darkening storm." As for John Le Mesurier's Bilbo, the comic actor who had played Sergeant Wilson in Dad's Army gave the part "a weary melancholy".

The scholar of humanities Brian Rosebury sets out criteria for adapting a complex work like The Lord of the Rings. The adaptation, he writes, must not simply use characters and names to relabel some existing formula, or rewrite the story into a generic style; it must retain as much as possible of the original when translating the narrative into a drama; it must keep the presentation fresh, avoid repetition, and retain plausibility; and it must especially retain the coherent feeling of a Middle-earth under threat, along with the book's momentum, coherence, moral conviction, and subtlety. Rosebury states that a radio production is "fundamentally hampered" by not being able to "suggest the physical and cultural presence of Middle-earth", other than through the limited medium of sound effects. In his view, the few passages of narration in the production "give tantalising glimpses of [Tolkien's] breadth of vision which fades painfully as the studio-bound dialogues resume." He finds the dialogue well delivered by the actors, admiring especially Peter Woodthorpe's "fine Gollum", and the abridgement skilful though subtly flattening Tolkien's text "in the direction of an adventure story." The version's strength, Rosebury writes, is in its rather faithful and almost complete rendering of the book's events, though as in Ralph Bakshi's animation and Peter Jackson's film version, without Tom Bombadil.

The Tolkien scholar Christina Scull thought it a "masterly adaptation", that stayed faithful to Tolkien's story, presented most of the characters "as he depicted them", and especially "caught the spirit of the books". She found the handling of the Battle of the Pelennor Fields with alliterative verse "a brilliant idea", and praised Gerard Murphy's narration. Comparing the production with Peter Jackson's interpretation, she felt that her "happiness with the BBC production made [her] even less happy with Jackson than I might have been without it", disliking the films' additional material, violence, and "the weakening of almost all the characters". In her view, the BBC dramatisation presented "the characters I [met] in the book", whereas the film version did not.

Peter Woodthorpe (Gollum/Sméagol) and Michael Graham Cox (Boromir) had previously voiced the same roles in Bakshi's film. Ian Holm, who voiced Frodo Baggins in the radio serial, went on to play Bilbo Baggins in Peter Jackson's movie trilogy.

Cast and credits 

The Lord of the Rings was dramatised for radio by Sibley and Michael Bakewell.
The music was composed by Stephen Oliver.
Radiophonic sound was provided by Elizabeth Parker. 
The series was produced and directed by Jane Morgan and Penny Leicester.

The cast for the production was:

 Narrator (UK version): Gerard Murphy
 Narrator (American version): Tammy Grimes
 Frodo Baggins: Ian Holm
 Gandalf the Grey/Gandalf the White: Michael Hordern
 Aragorn (Strider): Robert Stephens
 Sam Gamgee: Bill Nighy (credited as William Nighy)
 Meriadoc Brandybuck (Merry): Richard O'Callaghan
 Peregrin Took (Pippin): John McAndrew
 Legolas: David Collings
 Gimli: Douglas Livingstone
 Boromir: Michael Graham Cox
 Galadriel: Marian Diamond
 Celeborn: Simon Cadell
 Arwen Evenstar: Sonia Fraser
 Saruman the White: Peter Howell
 Elrond: Hugh Dickson
 Bilbo Baggins: John Le Mesurier
 Gollum/Sméagol: Peter Woodthorpe
 Théoden: Jack May
 Gríma Wormtongue: Paul Brooke
 Éowyn: Elin Jenkins
 Éomer: Anthony Hyde
 Faramir: Andrew Seear
 Treebeard: Stephen Thorne
 Denethor: Peter Vaughan
 Lord of the Nazgûl: Philip Voss
 The Mouth of Sauron: John Rye
 Glorfindel/An Elf lord of the house of Elrond half-elven : John Webb
 Haldir/Nazgûl/Nob/Minstrel: Haydn Wood
 Gamling: Patrick Barr
 Ceorl: Michael McStay
 Háma/A Nazgûl: Michael Spice
 Éothain/Otho Sackville-Baggins/Ruffian: John Livesy
 Halbarad: Martyn Read
 Beregond/The Black Rider/Guard: Christopher Scott
 Ioreth: Pauline Letts
 Gwaihir: Alexander John
 Radagast the Brown: Donald Gee
 Gaffer Gamgee: John Church
 Ted Sandyman/Snaga: Gordon Reid
 Rosie Cotton: Kathryn Hurlbutt
 Daddy Twofoot: Leonard Fenton
 Farmer Maggot/Ruffian: John Bott
 Lobelia Sackville-Baggins: Diana Bishop
 Farmer Cotton: Alan Dudley
 Proudfoot/Orc: Sean Arnold
 Elanor Gamgee: Harry Holm
 Barliman Butterbur: James Grout
 Uglúk: Brian Haines
 Shagrat: Christopher Fairbank
 Gorbag: David Sinclair
 Déagol/Bill Ferny/Orc Captain: Graham Faulkner
 Shelob: Jenny Lee, BBC Radiophonic Workshop
 Singer (Dream Voice/Bilbo's Last Song): Matthew Vine
 Singer (The Bard): Oz Clarke
 Singer (The Eagle/Voice of Lothlórien): David James

References

External links 

 Description and episode list
 Archive.org recordings

Radio programmes based on Middle-earth
1981 radio dramas
Fantasy radio programs
BBC Radio 4 programmes
Works based on The Lord of the Rings